Armenian newspapers are published in Armenia and in the Armenian diaspora where there are concentrations of Armenians.

Usually the newspapers are in the Armenian language, but many of the Armenian diaspora newspapers will usually have supplements or sections in the national language of the country where the newspaper is published.

Newspapers in Armenia

Newspapers in the Republic of Artsakh
 Aparaj - weekly, in Armenian, publication of ARF Artsakh Central Committee
 Azat Artsakh

Armenian daily and weekly newspapers in the diaspora

Argentina
 Diario Armenia Diario Armenia - in Armenian and Spanish
 Sardarabad - in Armenian and Spanish Sardarabad

Australia
 Armenia Armenian News from Australia - Armenia Media - Armenia Online Australia - armenia.com.au - in Armenian and English

Canada
 Abaka -  weekly, trilingual (Armenian, French, and English)
 Ardziv - Արծիւ - quarterly, official publication of the Armenian Youth Federation of Canada, trilingual (Armenian, French, English)
 Horizon -  weekly, trilingual (Armenian, French, English)
 Torontohye torontohye - Issuu -  monthly, bilingual (Armenian and English)

Cyprus

 Artsakank ARTSAKANK -  monthly, in Armenian, with sections in Greek and English
 Azad Tsayn - monthly, in Armenian
 Keghart - bimonthly, in Armenian

Egypt
 Arek - monthly, in Arabic
 Arev - daily, in Armenian
 Deghegadou - quarterly, in Armenian
 Housaper - daily, in Armenian
 Tchahagir - weekly, in Armenian

France
 Gamk  - in Armenian and French Home
 Haratch - daily, in Armenian (now defunct)
 Nor Haratch  - twice a week in Armenian - Home

Georgia
Miutyun
Vrastan

Greece
 Armenika Magazine αρμενικα - Διμηνιαίο Περιοδικό 
 Azat Or Գլխաւոր էջ - daily, in Armenian and Greek
 Nor Ashkharh (weekly)

India
 Azdarar Azdarar.com is for sale

Iran
 Alik Loading... - daily, in Armenian
 Arax Arax weekly - weekly, in Armenian

Lebanon
 Ararad  - daily, in Armenian - Home
 Aztag - daily, in Armenian - Home
 Massis - Armenian Catholic monthly in Armenian -Massis Online - Home
 Zartonk - daily, in Armenian - Home
Ayk - defunct daily, in Armenian

Poland
 Awedis  - quarterly, in Polish and Armenian, published by the Foundation of Culture and Heritage of Polish Armenians -Czasopismo ormiańskie "Awedis"

Russia
 Aniv - monthly of the Foundation for Dewvelopment and Support of Armenian Studies - Home
Armenian Times -  monthly, published in Moscow with another edition in Yerevan (Armenian, English and Russian)
 Gortsarar Home
 Havatamk 
 Noev Kovcheg magazine Русско-Армянская независимая газета Ноев Ковчег - газета армян
 Yerevan Yerevan.ru
 Yerkramas газета армян России

Syria
 Kantsasar Բերիոյ Հայոց Թեմի Առաջնորդութիւն - Perio Tem - weekly, in Armenian

Turkey
19th Century Constantinople was home to the first known Western Armenian journal published and edited by a woman (Elpis Kesaratsian). Entering circulation in 1862, Kit'arr or Guitar stayed in print for only seven months. Female writers who openly expressed their desires were viewed as immodest, but this changed slowly as journals began to publish more "women's sections". In the 1880s, Matteos Mamurian invited Srpouhi Dussap to submit essays for Arevelian Mamal. According to Zaruhi Galemkearian's autobiography, she was told to write about women's place in the family and home after she published two volumes of poetry in the 1890s. By 1900, several Armenian journals had started to include works by female contributors including the Constantinople-based Tsaghik.

 Agos Anasayfa - Armenian weekly ( in Turkish) and Armenian)
 Jamanak - daily, in Armenian
 Lraper - trilingual (Armenian, Turkish, English)
 Marmara   - daily, in Armenian -

United Kingdom
 Armenian Voice  - quarterly, in English, small section in Armenian

United States

 AMN Hye Kiank - weekly, in Armenian; national, East Coast and West Coast editions
Armenian Life - weekly, in English; national, East Coast and West Coast editions
 Armenian Mirror-Spectator  - weekly, in English
 Armenian Observer  - weekly, in English
 Armenian Reporter  - weekly, in English
 Armenian Weekly  - weekly, in English
 Asbarez  - daily, bilingual (Armenian, English)
 Baikar - weekly, in Armenian
 California Courier - weekly, in English
 Hairenik  - weekly, in Armenian
 Massis  - weekly, bilingual (Armenian, English)
 Nor Hayastan  - daily, in Armenian
 Nor Or  - weekly, in Armenian and English
 Oragark  - weekly, in Armenian, Glendale, California

Online Armenian news media in the diaspora

Pan-Armenian
Armenian Diaspora 
Hayern Aysor (Armenians Today) 
Pan-Armenian.net  - in Armenian, English, Russian

Belarus
Miasin

Cyprus
Aypoupen
Gibrahayer

Egypt
Armaveni

France
Gamk Online

Georgia
Akhaltskha - Samtskhe-Javakhk Online

Italy

Akhtamar (Italy)  - Armenian, Italian

Poland
Ormianie.pl ,  - in Polish, English, Armenian

Romania
Ararat

Russia
Miasin

United States
Groong Armenian News Network 
HyeMedia Armenian News (USA, London, Lebanon, Syria) 
Massis Post

Worldwide
Aypoupen.com (Gibros)  - English

Iran
Aliq Daily 
Iranahayer

Armenian periodicals in the diaspora

France
 Nouvelles d'Arménie  - monthly, in French

Jerusalem
Sion - Jerusalem, official organ of the Armenian Patriarchate of Jerusalem

Lebanon
Avedik - organ of the Armenian Catholic Church
Haigazian Armenological Review - Armenological publication of Haigazian University
Hask - organ of the Holy See of Cilicia  
Hask Armenological Review - Armenological publication of the Holy See of Cilicia
Khosnag - AGBU publication

United States
AMN Hye Kiank Armenian Weekly - general interest publication in Armenian, serving Armenian American community with national, East Coast and West Coast editions
Ararat Quarterly - literary and arts publication in English
USA Armenian Life - weekly magazine, general interest publication in English, serving the Armenian American community with national, East Coast and West Coast Editions

See also
List of newspapers in Armenia

Notes

References
Liladhar R Pendse, "An Introduction to Armenian Periodicals of the Eastern Mediterranean: A Bibliographic Study" (2017) 18 Slavic & East European Information Resources 3 to 32 Taylor & Francis
Dorota Skotarczak, "An Overview of Armenian Periodicals in Poland" (2014) 54 Armenian Review 69 to 78 (Spring/Summer, issue 3/4)
(1988) Newsletter, India Office Library and Records, issues 33-41, page 38 Google Books
Amalya Gełami Kirakosian. Hay parberakan mamuli matenagitut'yun (1794-1967) Hamahavak' c' ank. Erevan. 1970. Google Books WorldCat
Hovhannes Petrosyan. Hay parberakan mamuli bibliografia, 1794-1900. Erevan. 1956. Volume 2, 1900-1956. 1957.
Garegin Levonian or Lewonian or Levonyan. Hayots parberakan mamule: liakatar tsutsak Hay Iragrutyan skzbits minjev mer orere (1794-1934). Erevan. 1934. (or "Hayoc parperakan").

Armenian-language newspapers
Lists of newspapers by country